Essex County is a Canadian dramatic television limited series, scheduled to premiere on March 19, 2023 on CBC Television.

Premise
An adaptation of Jeff Lemire's graphic novel Essex County Trilogy, the series centres on two interconnected families in the Essex County region of Ontario.

Lester is a young boy who moves in with his uncle Ken after his mother's death, turning to Jimmy as a surrogate father figure; Anne is a nurse who is caring for her ailing uncle Lou.

Cast
 Molly Parker as Anne
 Brian J. Smith as Ken
 Stephen McHattie as Lou
 Finlay Wojtak-Hissong as Lester
 Kevin Durand as Jimmy
 Tamara Podemski
 Rossif Sutherland
 Jim Calarco
 Jordyn Gillis as Young Anne

Episodes

Development
The series was written by Jeff Lemire and Eilis Kirwan. It was shot principally in North Bay and West Nipissing, in fall 2022.

Release
A first look trailer was released on February 21, 2023. The series is set to be launched on March 19, 2023 on CBC and CBC Gem

References

External links

2020s Canadian drama television series
CBC Television original programming
Television shows filmed in North Bay, Ontario
2023 Canadian television series debuts